Tropidocephala is a genus of planthopper bugs, typical of the tribe Tropidocephalini.  
Species have been recorded from Africa, Europe and (mostly tropical) Asia.

Species
Fulgoromorpha Lists On the Web includes:

 Tropidocephala amboinensis Muir, 1913
 Tropidocephala andropogonis Horváth, 1895
 Tropidocephala andunna Kuoh, 1979
 Tropidocephala arcas Fennah, 1988
 Tropidocephala atrata (Distant, 1906)
 Tropidocephala baguioënsis Muir, 1916
 Tropidocephala bironis Matsumura, 1907
 Tropidocephala breviceps Matsumura, 1907
 Tropidocephala brunnipennis Signoret, 1860
 Tropidocephala butleri Muir, 1921
 Tropidocephala dingi Sun, Yang & Chen, 2014
 Tropidocephala dryas Kirkaldy, 1907
 Tropidocephala festiva (Distant, 1906)
 Tropidocephala flava Melichar, 1914
 Tropidocephala flaviceps Stål, 1855 - type species
 Tropidocephala flavovittata Matsumura, 1907
 Tropidocephala formosana Matsumura, 1910
 Tropidocephala gracilis Matsumura, 1907
 Tropidocephala hamadryas Kirkaldy, 1907
 Tropidocephala indica Muir, 1921
 Tropidocephala insperata Yang, 1989
 Tropidocephala jiawenna Kuoh, 1979
 Tropidocephala luteola Distant, 1912
 Tropidocephala maculosa Matsumura, 1907
 Tropidocephala malayana Matsumura, 1907
 Tropidocephala marginepunctata (Melichar, 1903)
 Tropidocephala neoamboinensis Muir, 1913
 Tropidocephala neoelegans Muir, 1913
 Tropidocephala neogracilis Muir, 1913
 Tropidocephala nigra (Matsumura, 1900)
 Tropidocephala nigrocacuminis Muir, 1916
 Tropidocephala orientalis Ding, 2006
 Tropidocephala prasina Melichar, 1902
 Tropidocephala prasina lateralis Melichar, 1902
 Tropidocephala prolixa Guo & Liang, 2005
 Tropidocephala pseudobaguioensis Muir, 1916
 Tropidocephala russa Ding, 2006
 Tropidocephala saccharicola Muir, 1913
 Tropidocephala saccharivorella Matsumura, 1907
 Tropidocephala serendiba (Melichar, 1903)
 Tropidocephala simaoensis Ding, 2006
 Tropidocephala sinica Ding, 2006
 Tropidocephala speciosa (Bierman, 1908)
 Tropidocephala touchi Kuoh, 1979
 Tropidocephala tuberipennis (Mulsant & Rey, 1855)
 Tropidocephala tyro Fennah, 1988
 Tropidocephala ucalegon Fennah, 1988
 Tropidocephala umbrina Linnavuori, 1973
 Tropidocephala viridula (Bierman, 1908)
 Tropidocephala yichangensis Ding, 2006
 Tropidocephala zela Fennah, 1988
 Tropidocephala zeno Fennah, 1988

References

External Links

Auchenorrhyncha genera
Delphacidae
Hemiptera of Africa
Hemiptera of Europe
Hemiptera of Asia